The Mellon family is a wealthy and influential American family from Pittsburgh, Pennsylvania. The family includes Andrew Mellon, one of the longest-serving U.S. Treasury Secretaries, along with prominent members in the judicial, banking, financial, business, and political professions, as well as a famous recluse, Cordelia Scaife May.

History

The American branch of the Mellon family traces its origins to County Tyrone, Northern Ireland. In 1816, Archibald Mellon emigrated from Northern Ireland to the United States and set up residence in Westmoreland County, Pennsylvania.  Two years later, Archibald was joined by his son, Andrew, and his family. 

The family's wealth originated with Mellon Bank, founded in 1869 by Archibald's grandson. Thomas Mellon. Under the direction of Thomas's son, Andrew William Mellon, the Mellons became principal investors and majority owners of Gulf Oil (which merged with Chevron Corporation in 1985), Alcoa (since 1886), The Pittsburgh Tribune-Review (since 1970), Koppers (since 1912), New York Shipbuilding (1899–1968) and Carborundum Corporation, as well as their major financial and ownership influence on Westinghouse Electric, H.J. Heinz Company,  Newsweek, U.S. Steel, Credit Suisse First Boston and General Motors. The family bank would go on to merge with the Bank of New York to become BNY Mellon

The family also founded the National Gallery of Art in Washington, D.C., donating both art works and funds, and is a patron to the University of Pittsburgh, Carnegie Mellon University, Yale University, the Hôpital Albert Schweitzer in Haiti, and with art the University of Virginia. Carnegie Mellon University, and its Mellon College of Science, is named in honor of the family, as well as for its founder, Andrew Carnegie, who was a close associate of the Mellons. 
The family's founding patriarch was Judge Thomas Mellon (1813–1908), the son of Andrew Mellon and Rebecca Wauchob, who were Scotch-Irish farmers from Camp Hill Cottage, in Lower Castletown, County Tyrone, Ireland, and emigrated to what is now the Pittsburgh suburb of north-central Westmoreland County, Pennsylvania.  The family can be divided into four branches: the descendants of Thomas Alexander Mellon Jr, of James Ross Mellon, of Andrew William Mellon, and of Richard Beatty Mellon. The Mellon family are members of the Episcopal Church.

Prominent members

 Thomas Mellon (1813–1908), judge and founder of the Mellon Bank; married Sarah Jane Negley of Pittsburgh. As a boy he decided to abandon his parents' farming lifestyle for law and banking in the city after reading Benjamin Franklin's autobiography.
 Andrew William Mellon (1855–1937), banker, one of the longest-serving U.S. Treasury secretaries in history; namesake of the Andrew Mellon Building and Andrew W. Mellon Auditorium, both in Washington, D.C.
 Richard Beatty Mellon (1858–1933), banker, industrialist and philanthropist; married Jennie Taylor King
 William Larimer Mellon, Sr. (1868–1949), a founder of the Gulf Oil Corporation 
 Richard King Mellon (1899–1970), financier, general, and philanthropist; married Constance Prosser McCaulley
 Sarah Mellon (1903–1965), heiress of investments in Mellon Bank, Gulf Oil and Alcoa; her husband was Alan Magee Scaife
 William Larimer Mellon, Jr. (1910–1989), founder of the Hôpital Albert Schweitzer Haiti
 Cordelia Scaife May (1928–2005), famous recluse and funder of multiple anti-immigration organizations
 Richard Mellon Scaife (1932–2014), the chief sponsor of the Heritage Foundation and publisher of the Pittsburgh Tribune-Review since 1970; first marriage was to Frances L. Gilmore (born December 2, 1934), second marriage was to Margaret "Ritchie" Battle (1947–2005)
 Timothy Mellon (b. 1942), chairman and majority owner of Pan Am Systems, a transportation holding company based in Portsmouth, New Hampshire
 James Ross ("Jay") Mellon II (b. 1942), author of books about Abraham Lincoln, slavery in America, and his family's founding patriarch, Thomas Mellon; he travels permanently in order to legally minimize taxes
 Christopher Mellon (b. 1958), Deputy Assistant Secretary of Defense for Intelligence in the Clinton and Bush Administrations; former minority staff director of the US Senate Select Committee on Intelligence, adjunct professor at Georgetown University; private equity investor; and former National Security Affairs Advisor at To the Stars Academy
 Matthew Taylor Mellon II (1964–2018), a chairman of the Republican Party Finance of New York and served as a regent director of finance for the Republican National Committee; founded or participated in multiple start-ups such as Jimmy Choo, Harrys of London, Hanley Mellon, Marquis Jets, Arrival Aviation and Challenge Capital Partners
 Mike Monroney (1902–1980), United States Senator from Oklahoma who wrote and sponsored legislation such as the Federal Aviation Act of 1958 and the Automobile Information Disclosure Act of 1958, the latter of which made him the namesake of the Monroney sticker; married to Mary Ellen Mellon of the Mellon family

Members

Thomas Mellon (1813–1908) ∞ 1843: Sarah Jane Negley (1817–1909)
Thomas Alexander Mellon, Jr., (1844–1899) ∞ Mary C. Caldwell (1847–1902), the sister of Alexander Caldwell
Thomas Alexander Mellon, III (1873–1948) ∞ Helen McLanahan Wightman (1871–1961)
Edward Purcell Mellon, II ∞ Louise Grubbs
Thomas Alexander Mellon, IV
Helen S. Mellon (1914–2007) ∞ 1936: Adolph William Schmidt (1904–2000)
Helen Schmidt ∞ unk. Claire
Thomas Mellon Schmidt (b. 1940)
Edward Purcell Mellon (1875–1953) ∞ Ethel Churchill Humphrey (1880–1938)
Jane Caldwell Mellon (1917–2013) ∞ (1) Craigh Leonard ∞ (2) Robinson Simonds (1906–2000)
Edward M. Leonard
Craigh Leonard, Jr.
Stephanie Leonard
Mary Caldwell Mellon (1884–1975) ∞ (1) John Herman Kampmann (1880–1957) ∞ (2) Samuel Alfred McClung (1880–1945)
John Herman Kampmann, Jr. (1907–1940)
Mary Mellon Kampmann (1908–1995) ∞ Lawrence Deen Schwartz (1909–1957)
Samuel Alfred McClung, III (1918–2015) ∞ Adelaide "Adie" Smith (1919–2000)
Isabel Edith McClung (1920–1967) ∞ Charles Laban Abernethy, Jr. (1913–1990), the son of Charles Laban Abernethy
Cynthia Mellon McClung (1921–1991) ∞ Stephen Stone, Jr. (1915–1962)
James Ross Mellon (1846–1934) ∞ Rachel Hughey Larimer (1847–1919), the daughter of William Larimer
William Larimer Mellon (1868–1949) ∞ Mary Hill Taylor
Matthew Taylor Mellon (1897–1992) ∞ (1) 1931: (div.) Gertrud Altegoer (1909–2005) ∞ (2) Jane Bartrum
Karl Negley Mellon (1938–1983) ∞ Anne Stokes Bright 
Christopher Mellon (b. 1958)
Hunter Mellon (b. 2001)
Aiden Mellon (b. 2004)
Matthew Taylor Mellon, II (1964–2018) ∞ (1) 2000: (div. 2005) Tamara Yeardye (b. 1967) ∞ (2) Nicole Hanley
Araminta Mellon (b. 2002)
Force Mellon (b. 2011)
Olympia Mellon (b. 2013)
James Ross Mellon, II (b. 1942) ∞ Vivian Ruesch, the daughter of Hans Ruesch
Rachel Larimer Mellon (1899–2006) ∞ John Fawcett Walton, Jr. (1893–1974)
Farley Walton ∞ Joshua Clyde Whetzel, Jr. (1921–2012)
Joshua Clyde Whetzel, III ∞ Marion Plunkett 
Rachel Walton Whetzel ∞ Richard Casselman
Thomas Porter Whetzel
William Mellon Whetzel ∞ (1) 1978: (div.) Patricia Joan McGarey ∞ (2) Camilla F. 
Mary Walton ∞ Walter J. P. Curley, Jr.
John Fawcett Walton, III ∞ Phyllis Walton 
James Mellon Walton (1930–2022) ∞ Ellen Carroll
James Mellon Walton, Jr. ∞ Elizabeth Andrews Orr 
Margaret Lederle Mellon (1901–1998) ∞ (1) 1924: Alexander Laughlin (d. 1926) ∞ (2) 1928: Thomas Hitchcock, Jr. (1900–1944)
Alexander Mellon Laughlin (b. 1925)
Louise Eustis Hitchcock
Margaret Mellon Hitchcock
Thomas Hitchcock, III
William Mellon Hitchcock
William Larimer Mellon, Jr. (1910–1989) ∞ (1) 1930: (div. 1938) Grace Rowley ∞ (2) 1946: Gwen Grant Mellon (née Rawson; 1911–2000), former wife of John de Groot Rawson
William Larimer Mellon, III (1933–1963) ∞ Katherine LeGrand Council
Sarah Lucille Mellon (1887–1968) ∞ (1) Alexander Grange ∞ (2) George S. Hasbrouck ∞ (3) Sidney J. Holloway 
Sarah Emma Mellon, who died in childhood
Annie Rebecca Mellon, who died in childhood
Samuel Selwyn Mellon, who died 1862, at age 9
Andrew William Mellon (1855–1937) ∞ 1900: (div. 1912) Nora Mary McMullen (1879–1973)
Ailsa Mellon Bruce (1901–1969) ∞ 1926: (div. 1945) David Kirkpatrick Este Bruce (1898–1977)
Audrey Mellon Bruce (1934–1967) ∞ 1955: Stephen Currier (d. 1967), son of Mary Warburg
Andrea Bruce Currier (b. 1956) ∞ 1980: Donald Wright Patterson, Jr. (1939)
Justin Bruce Patterson ∞ 2013: Anna Elizabeth Burke
Lavinia Currier ∞ Joel McCleary
Michael Stephen Currier (1961–1998) ∞ Karin Griscom
Paul Mellon (1907–1999) ∞ (1) 1935: Mary Conover Brown (1904–1946) ∞ (2) 1948: Rachel Lambert Mellon (1910–2014), former wife of Stacy Barcroft Lloyd Jr
Timothy Mellon (b. 1943)
Catherine Conover Mellon ∞ 1957: (div. 1973) John W. Warner III (1927-2021)
Virginia Warner
John William Warner, IV (b. 1962) ∞ Shannon Ford Hamm (b. 1965)
Mary Warner
Richard Beatty Mellon (1858–1933) ∞ Jennie King (d. 1938)
Richard King Mellon (1899–1970) ∞ 1936: Constance Mary ( Prosser) McCaulley (later Burrell; 1910-1980)
Richard Prosser Mellon (1939–2020) ∞ (1) Gertrude Adams (1939–2003) (2) Kathryn Dybdal
Richard Adams Mellon ∞ Alex Mellon
Armour Negley Mellon ∞ Sophie Mellon
Cassandra King Mellon (b. 1940) ∞ (1) George M. Henderson ∞ (2) 1979: Edwin Van Rensselaer Milbury
Christina Mellon Henderson ∞ 1996: Scott Robert McBroom
Bruce King Mellon Henderson
Constance Barber Mellon (1941–1983) ∞ William Russell Grace Byers (d. 1999) (brother in law of Joseph Verner Reed Jr.) ∞ (2) 1971: (div. 1973) J. Carter Brown (1934–2002)
William Russell Grace Byers, Jr. (b. 1965)
Alison Mellon Byers (b. 1967)
Seward Prosser Mellon (b. 1942)
Sarah Cordelia Mellon (1903–1965) ∞ Alan Magee Scaife (1900–1958)
Cordelia Scaife May (1928–2005) ∞ (1) 1949: (div. 1950) (1) Herbert A. May, Jr. ∞ (2) 1973: Robert Duggan (1926/7–1974)
Richard Mellon Scaife (1932–2014) ∞ (1) 1956: (div. 1991) Frances L. Gilmore (b. 1934) ∞ (2) 1991: (div. 2012) Margaret "Ritchie" Battle (b. 1947)
Jennie K. Scaife (1963–2018)
Mary M. Ferri (b.1915)
David N. Scaife (b. 1966)
George Negley Mellon (1860–1887)

Network

Associates

Edward Goodrich Acheson
Diamond Jim Brady
Alexander Caldwell
Arthur Vining Davis
William Donner
Joseph Duveen
David E. Finley Jr.
Henry Clay Frick
James M. Guffey
Joseph R. Grundy
Henry John Heinz II
Philander C. Knox
Henry W. Oliver
David A. Reed
Adolph W. Schmidt
Arthur Sixsmith
John W. Warner III
Cyrus Woods

Businesses

Alcoa
Carborundum Corporation
Crane Holdings
Crucible Steel Company 
General Reinsurance Corporation
Gulf Oil
H.J. Heinz Company
H.K. Porter, Inc.
Idlewild Park
Koppers
Ligonier Valley Railroad
McClintic-Marshall Construction Company
MellonDrexel 
Mellon National Bank
Monongahela River Coal Company
New York Shipbuilding Corporation
Old Overholt
Pan Am Systems
Perma Treat 
Pittsburgh Coal Company 
Pittsburgh Tribune-Review
Pittsburgh,Westmoreland & Somerset Railroad
Rokeby Stables
Sacramento Union
Spring Valley Mining & Irrigation Company 
Standard Steel Car Company
Westinghouse Electric Corporation

Philanthropy & miscellaneous nonprofits

Allegheny Foundation 
Andrew W. Mellon Foundation
Beechwood Farms Nature Reserve
Bollingen Foundation
Cape Hatteras National Seashore
Carnegie-Mellon University
Colcom Foundation
Carthage Foundation 
Ezra Stiles College
Hôpital Albert Schweitzer Haiti
Jacqueline Kennedy Garden
KQV
Laurel Foundation
Maurepas Swamp Wildlife Management Area
Mellon Trust
Morse College
National Gallery of Art
National Legal and Policy Center
Paul Mellon Centre for Studies in British Art
Rachel Mellon Walton Fund 
Richard King Mellon Foundation
Sky Meadows State Park
University of Pittsburgh
White House Rose Garden

Buildings, estates & historic sites

Andrew Mellon Building 
Andrew W. Mellon Auditorium
Cathedral of Learning
Dune House 
East Liberty Market
East Liberty Presbyterian Church
Mellon Carriage House
Mellon National Bank Building
Mellon Park
Mellon Square
National Portrait Gallery
Oak Spring Garden 
Penguin Court 
Rolling Rock Club
Scallop Path

References

Bibliography

External links

 
American families of Scotch-Irish ancestry
Business families of the United States
Episcopalian families
Political families of the United States